In Visible Silence is the second full-length release by avant-garde pop group Art of Noise in April 1986, and the first created by members Anne Dudley, J. J. Jeczalik and Gary Langan in the wake of their departure from the ZTT record label that had been the home of the group's genesis.

The first single, "Legs", was released in late 1985, followed by two major hits on the UK chart in 1986: "Peter Gunn", that featured guitar legend Duane Eddy; and "Paranoimia" with television personality Max Headroom, where actor Matt Frewer performed two different monologues for each of the 7" and 12" versions.

"Legacy", a re-worked version of Legs released as a single in late 1986, was taken from a special limited edition bonus album, Re-works of Art of Noise. A live version of the album was recorded in Hammersmith, London and released on VHS and 12-inch CD Video in 1987.

LP and cassette (version 1)

Side one
 "Opus 4" – 1:59
 "Paranoimia" – 4:46
 "Eye of a Needle" – 4:25
 "Legs" – 4:06
 "Slip of the Tongue" – 1:30
 "Backbeat" – 4:12

Side two
 "Instruments of Darkness" – 7:12
 "Peter Gunn" (featuring Duane Eddy) – 3:55
 "Camilla: The Old, Old Story" – 7:23
 "The Chameleon's Dish" – 4:17
 "Beatback" – 1:19

Compact Disc (version 2)
Catalogue CCD 1528 (UK)

 "Opus 4" – 1:59
 "Paranoimia" – 4:46
 "Eye of a Needle" – 4:25
 "Legs" – 4:06
 "Slip of the Tongue" – 1:30
 "Backbeat" – 4:12
 "Instruments of Darkness" – 7:12
 "Peter Gunn" (featuring Duane Eddy) – 3:55
 "Camilla: The Old, Old Story" – 7:23
 "The Chameleon's Dish" – 4:17
 "Beatback" – 1:19
 "Peter Gunn" (Extended Version) (featuring Duane Eddy) – 6:01

Limited edition cassette (version 3)

Side one
 "Opus 4" – 1:59
 "Paranoimia" – 4:46
 "Eye of a Needle" – 4:25
 "Legs" – 4:06
 "Slip of the Tongue" – 1:30
 "Backbeat" – 4:12
 "Paranoimia" (with Max Headroom) – 3:18 unlisted

Side two
 "Instruments of Darkness" – 7:12
 "Peter Gunn" (featuring Duane Eddy) – 3:55
 "Camilla: The Old, Old Story" – 7:23
 "The Chameleon's Dish" – 4:17
 "Beatback" – 1:19

US Revised edition (version 4)

Side one
 "Opus 4" – 1:59
 "Paranoimia" (Extended Version) (with Max Headroom) – 6:40
 "Eye of a Needle" – 4:25
 "Legs" – 4:06
 "Slip of the Tongue" – 1:30
 "Backbeat" – 4:12

Side two
 "Instruments of Darkness" – 7:12
 "Peter Gunn" (featuring Duane Eddy) – 3:55
 "Camilla: The Old, Old Story" – 7:23
 "The Chameleon's Dish" – 4:17
 "Beatback" – 1:19

Limited edition with special free bonus album "Re-works of Art of Noise" (version 5)

Record one, side one
 "Opus 4" – 1:59
 "Paranoimia" – 4:46
 "Eye of a Needle" – 4:25
 "Legs" – 4:06
 "Slip of the Tongue" – 1:30
 "Backbeat" – 4:12

Record one, side two
 "Instruments of Darkness" – 7:12
 "Peter Gunn" (featuring Duane Eddy) – 3:55
 "Camilla: The Old, Old Story" – 7:23
 "The Chameleon's Dish" – 4:17
 "Beatback" – 1:19

Record two "Re-works of Art of Noise", side one
 "Paranoimia" (7" Version) (with Max Headroom) – 3:18
 "Legacy" (Extended Version) – 8:20
 "Peter Gunn" (Extended Version) (featuring Duane Eddy) – 6:01

Record two "Re-works of Art of Noise", side two
 "Legs (Live)" – 4:03
 "Paranoimia" (Live) – 4:58
 "Hammersmith To Tokyo and Back" (Live) – 9:58

1988 UK and European CD re-issue (version 6)

 "Opus 4" – 1:59
 "Paranoimia" – 4:46
 "Eye of a Needle" – 4:25
 "Legs" – 4:06
 "Slip of the Tongue" – 1:30
 "Backbeat" – 4:12
 "Instruments of Darkness" – 7:12
 "Peter Gunn" (featuring Duane Eddy) – 3:55
 "Camilla: The Old, Old Story" – 7:23
 "The Chameleon's Dish" – 4:17
 "Beatback" – 1:19
 "Peter Gunn" (The Twang Mix) (featuring Duane Eddy) – 7:28

2017 Deluxe Edition (version 7 - Release date 19 May 2017)

CD 1
 Opus 4 [2017 Remastered Version]
 Paranoimia [2017 Remastered Version]
 Eye of a Needle [2017 Remastered Version]
 Legs [2017 Remastered Version]
 Slip of the Tongue [2017 Remastered Version]
 Backbeat [2017 Remastered Version]
 Instruments of Darkness [2017 Remastered Version]
 Peter Gunn (feat. Duane Eddy) [2017 Remastered Version]
 Camilla [2017 Remastered Version]
 The Chameleon's Dish [2017 Remastered Version]
 Beatback [2017 Remastered Version]
 Paranoimia (feat. Max Headroom) (7" Mix) [2017 Remastered Version]
 Legs (7" Mix) [2017 Remastered Version]
 Hoops and Mallets (7" Mix) [2017 Remastered Version]
 Something Always Happens [2017 Remastered Version]
 Why Me? [2017 Remastered Version]
 A Nation Rejects [2017 Remastered Version]
 Backbeat (Reprise)

CD 2
 World War II
 The First Leg
 Happy Harry's High Club
 Chameleon 4
 Beddoo-Bedoo
 Panic
 Camel
 Second Legs
 Trumpton Boogie
 Chameleon 1
 A Nation Regrets
 Legs (Inside Leg Mix) [2017 Remastered Version]
 Legs (Last Leg Mix) [2017 Remastered Version]
 Peter Gunn (feat. Duane Eddy) [Extended Version] [2017 Remastered Version]
 Peter Gunn (feat. Duane Eddy) [The Twang Mix] [2017 Remastered Version]
 Paranoimia (feat. Max Headroom) [Extended Version] [2017 Remastered Version]
 Paranoimia (feat. Max Headroom) [The Paranoid Mix] [2017 Remastered Version]

The original UK CD edition added the 6:01 Extended Version of Peter Gunn as a bonus track; the first and second US CD editions did not include it and the revised second edition replaced the original version of "Paranoimia" with the Extended Version featuring Max Headroom. Later 1988 UK & European reissues featured The Twang Mix of "Peter Gunn" replacing the Extended Version as a bonus track.

References

External links
 
 

Art of Noise albums
1986 albums
China Records albums
Chrysalis Records albums